Susan Mary Yeats (25 August 1866 – 5 January 1949), known as Lily Yeats, was an embroiderer associated with the Celtic Revival. In 1908 she founded the embroidery department of Cuala Industries, with which she was involved until its dissolution in 1931. She is known for her embroidered pictures.

Early life and education
Born in Enniscrone, County Sligo, Ireland on 25 August 1866, she was the daughter of John Butler Yeats and Susan Yeats (née Pollexfen). Her siblings were William Butler, Jack and Elizabeth Yeats. She was a sick child. Susan brought the children every year on holidays to her parents recently acquired home at Merville (1965) just outside the town of Sligo, sometimes staying til Christmas. The longest time was from July 1872 until November 1874, during which time John Butler often joined them.  The maternal grandparents were William Pollexfen and Elizabeth (nee Middleton). In late 1874 the Yeats family moved to 14 Edith Villas, West Kensington, London. Whilst living there, Yeats and her siblings were educated by a governess, Martha Jowitt until 1876. In 1878, the family moved to a larger house in Bedford Park, Chiswick, where she attended Notting Hill school for a short time.The Yeats family moved to Howth, Co. Dublin in 1881, where Lily enrolled in the Dublin Metropolitan School of Art along with her sister Elizabeth in 1883. They also took classes in the Royal Dublin Society.

The Yeats family moved to Eardley Crescent, South Kensington, Yeats became ill and was sent to live with relatives. She eventually went to live with her aunt Elizabeth Pollexfen Orr and her invalided mother in Huddersfield in 1887. In 1888, she returned to the family home in 3 Blenheim Road, Bedford Park. From here, the family often visited with William Morris at Kelmscott House.  Money was tight, and Lily was offered an opportunity to learn embroidery in the style propounded by Morris, which would become known as art needlework. She attended the Chiswick School of Art with her sister Susan and brother Jack and also studied under Morris's daughter May, who ran the embroidery section of Morris & Co. and worked there until April 1894 when she left due to ill health. She worked for a time as a governess at Hyère in the south of France. Whilst there, she contracted typhoid, and returned to London in December 1896. From late 1897, writer Susan L. Mitchell lodged with the Yeats family, when Yeats and Mitchell became close friends. By 10 December 1888 Yeats had returned to Morris & Co. and was paid ten shillings for her first week's work for the firm. By March 1889 Lily was training embroideresses for the firm.

Career
Yeats returned to Dublin in 1900, she and her sister Elizabeth joined Evelyn Gleeson in the Dun Emer crafts studio, where she ran the needlework section.

Lily continued to work under May Morris for six years, but their relationship was strained (she called her employer "the Gorgon" in her scrapbook) In 1895, Lily caught typhoid fever while in France, and her health remained uncertain for the remainder of the decade. After their mother's death in 1900 Lily and her sister Elizabeth returned to Ireland with their friend Evelyn Gleeson. In 1902 the three founded a craft studio near Dublin which they named Dun Emer (the Fort of Emer) after Emer, the wife of Irish legendary hero Cuchullain.  Dun Emer became a focus of the burgeoning Irish Arts and Crafts Movement, focusing on embroidery, printing, and rug and tapestry-making. They recruited young local women to the enterprise, teaching them painting, drawing, cooking, sewing, and the Irish language in addition to the Guild's core crafts. Lily Yeats ran the embroidery department, which created textiles for church decoration and domestic use.

In 1904, the operation was reorganized into two parts, the Dun Emer Guild run by Gleeson and Dun Emer Industries under the direction of the Yeats sisters, and in 1908 the groups separated completely.  Gleeson retained the Dun Emer name, and the Yeats sisters established Cuala Industries at nearby Churchtown, which ran a small press, the Cuala Press, and an embroidery workshop. William Butler Yeats's wife George (Bertha Georgina), helped Lily run the embroidery arm of the studio which produced clothing and linens.The Yeats sisters lived together through their adult lives, albeit contentiously. In 1923, Lily fell dangerously ill with what was believed to be tuberculosis while on holiday in London, and her brother lodged her in a London nursing home in July, where she remained until the following April. On her recovery, she returned to Cuala, but the embroidery department was never a resounding success.  Lily's health deteriorated again in 1931 (her ailment had finally been correctly diagnosed as a malformed thyroid in 1929), and the decision was made to dissolve the embroidery branch of Cuala.  At the time, Lily wrote

Lily Yeats continued to sell embroidered pictures in the following years. She died in 1949.

Notes

References

Susan Yeats at Trent University Archives

Further reading
 Hardwick, Joan. The Yeats Sisters : A Biography of Susan and Elizabeth Yeats. (HarperCollins. Pandora, 1996). .
 William M. Murphy. "Family Secrets: William Butler Yeats and His Relatives."  Syracuse University Press, 1995.

External links

 Dun Emer and Cuala Press publications explored in National Library of Ireland exhibition
  Yeats Society Sligo 
 Boston College collection of Yeats family papers at John J. Burns Library, Boston College

Embroideries by Lily Yeats
 Two Magpies on a Stone Wall, c. 1934
 Peonies and plums, embroidered cushion square
 Mary in a Cloak

Lily
Irish designers
Embroiderers
People from County Sligo
1866 births
1949 deaths
19th-century Irish people
Irish women artists
19th-century women textile artists
19th-century textile artists